The 1974 New York Sets season was the inaugural season for the franchise in World Team Tennis (WTT). The team had 15 wins and 29 losses and finished in last place in the Atlantic Section.

Season Recap

The Sets were founded as a charter franchise in World Team Tennis by Jerry Saperstein, son of Harlem Globetrotters founder Abe Saperstein. During the inaugural season, Saperstein sold the team to New York businessman Sol Berg.

On May 7, 1974, the Sets played their inaugural match on their home court at the Nassau Veterans Memorial Coliseum in the hamlet of Uniondale in the town of Hempstead, New York against the Hawaii Leis. The Sets drew 4,999 fans for their opening match. Under rules used only during the first few weeks of the season, the match comprised two sets of women's singles, two sets of men's singles and two sets of mixed doubles. No men's or women's doubles were played. WTT changed the match format on May 18, 1974, to one set each of men's singles, women's singles, men's doubles, women's doubles and mixed doubles. Pam Teeguarden lost the opening set of women's singles for the Sets, 6–4, to Valerie Ziegenfuss. The Leis went on to win four of the six sets and take the match, 29–25.

After opening the season with two losses at home, the Sets got their first victory in franchise history on the road beating the Cleveland Nets, 31–30, on May 12. Following the win over the Nets, the Sets lost 10 straight matches to fall to 1–12. They followed this with five wins in the next six matches to improve to 6–13. From there, the Sets lost seven of the next 10 matches and fell to 9–20. After winning three out of five matches, the Sets lost three straight to drop to 12–25 and assured themselves of a losing season. A three-match winning streak, tying their longest of the season, brought the Sets to 15–25. However, the Sets finished the season by losing four straight and cemented their position in last place in the Atlantic Section.

Match log
Reference:
{| align="center" border="1" cellpadding="2" cellspacing="1" style="border:1px solid #aaa"
|-
! colspan="2" style="background:#568203; color:#333399" | Legend
|-
! bgcolor="ccffcc" | Sets Win
! bgcolor="ffbbbb" | Sets Loss
|-
! colspan="2" | Home team in CAPS
|}

Team roster
Reference: 

 Manuel Santana, Player-Coach
 Fiorella Bonicelli
 Carole Caldwell Graebner
 Ceci Martinez
 Sandy Mayer
 Charlie Owens
 Niki Pilić
 Gene Scott
 Pam Teeguarden
 Virginia Wade
 Sharon Walsh

See also

 New York Apples
 1974 World Team Tennis season
 World TeamTennis

References

External links
Official WTT Website

New York Sets seasons
New York Apples seasons
New York Sets
Tennis in New York (state)
1974 in sports in New York (state)
1974 in American tennis